Ghost Nation is an American reality television series whose main theme is paranormal investigation. The show premiered on the Travel Channel on October 11, 2019 and moved exclusively to discovery+ on January 16, 2021. The show stars paranormal investigators Jason Hawes, Steve Gonsalves and Dave Tango, formerly from the Ghost Hunters television series, which aired on Syfy from 2004 to 2016, and aired on A&E after being revived in 2019.

Hawes, Gonsalves, and Tango, all members of the paranormal investigation group T.A.P.S., which Hawes founded, now founding members of the United Paranormal Research Organization (UPRO), respond to calls from investigators who need help with their cases in investigating reportedly haunted locations in the United States. Using a strict methodology and much of the technology from T.A.P.S. and Ghost Hunters, Hawes, Gonsalves and Tango investigate private residences while aiming to support a national and global network of paranormal investigators. The series ended when Hawes, Gonsalves, and Tango returned to Ghost Hunters after it moved to Travel Channel.

Premise 
The T.A.P.S. group helped to create "United Paranormal Research Organization (UPRO)", which aims to be a global paranormal investigation organization that keeps smaller, local organizations connected. The show features T.A.P.S. efforts to support fellow researchers through that organization at a national level. Hawes, who also produces the series, has stated the intent of the show differs from Ghost Hunters in that: "... you're able to see us connecting with local researchers that are bringing us in on cases they've hit a road block on. ... It's about getting back to basics, keeping it real, and truly helping people."

Cast
 Jason Hawes
 Steve Gonsalves
 Dave Tango
 Shari DeBenedetti (Season 2)

Production
The series premiered on October 11, 2019 on Travel Channel. On December 11, 2019, the series was renewed for a second season which premiered on April 22, 2020.

Episodes

Season 1 (2019)

Season 2 (2020-2021)

See also 

Apparitional experience
List of ghost films

References

External links 
 Ghost Nation webpage at Travel Channel.com
 United Paranormal Research Organization (UPO) website

Ghost Hunters (TV series)
2010s American reality television series
2020s American reality television series
2019 American television series debuts
English-language television shows
Paranormal reality television series
Television series about ghosts
Travel Channel original programming